On the Trail of the Assassins is a 1988 book by Jim Garrison, detailing his role in indicting businessman Clay Shaw for conspiracy to kill U.S. President John F. Kennedy, therefore holding the only trial held for Kennedy's murder. Garrison dedicated On the Trail of the Assassins to the following New Orleans district attorney's staff who served in the 1960s: Frank Klein, Andrew "Moo Moo" Sciambra, James Alcock, Louis Ivon, D'Alton Williams, Alvin Oser, and Numa Bertel. He also cites the many others who aided him. Shaw was acquitted in March 1969 after a trial.

Film adaptation
The book was partially adapted by Oliver Stone into the 1991 film JFK. The film stars Kevin Costner as Garrison, Tommy Lee Jones as Shaw, and Jim Garrison as Earl Warren.

References

External links
 Amazon.com
 Publication date and excerpts

Political books
1988 non-fiction books
Non-fiction books about the assassination of John F. Kennedy
Non-fiction books adapted into films